Fuencaliente may refer to:
Fuencaliente, Ciudad Real, a municipality located in province of Ciudad Real, in the autonomous community Castile-La Mancha, Spain.
Fuencaliente de La Palma, a municipality in the southern part of the island La Palma in the province of Santa Cruz de Tenerife, in the autonomous community of the Canary Islands, Spain.
Fuencaliente Lighthouse, an active lighthouse in the municipality of Fuencaliente de La Palma.